County Hall is a municipal facility at West Street in Chichester, West Sussex. It is the headquarters of West Sussex County Council.

History
Following the implementation of the Local Government Act 1888, which established county councils in every county, the town hall in Horsham was used initially as the meeting place for West Sussex County Council. After finding that the town hall was too cramped to accommodate both the town council and the county council, county leaders decided to acquire Edes House in West Street in Chichester as a meeting place and administrative centre in 1916. By the late 1920s county leaders were seeking larger facilities: the site they chose was open land to the north of Edes House.

The new building, which was designed by Cecil G Stillman, the County Architect, in the Georgian Revival style, was completed in 1933. The design involved a symmetrical main frontage with twenty-one bays facing onto a central courtyard; the central section of eleven bays, which projected slightly forward, featured a doorway on the ground floor flanked by Ionic order columns supporting an entablature with a pediment above; there was a tall round-headed window between the first and second floors with an open round-headed pediment above; the end sections of the main frontage contained arched carriageways to permit vehicle access to the rear of the site and there were side wings beyond that. Internally, the principal room was the council chamber.

The main building was altered in the 1960s to accommodate an emergency control centre in case of a nuclear attack. The county council also acquired a Victorian mansion known as "The Grange" at that time: the old house, which was located to the north east of the main building, was demolished and replaced by a modern office block also known as "The Grange". Another modern facility known as "Northleigh House" was built just south of The Grange in 1974.

The Princess Royal attended a reception for the Council of Occupational Therapists in County Hall on 19 April 2010 and a major programme of refurbishment works to convert the building into an open-plan working environment was completed in 2011.

References

Buildings and structures in Chichester
County halls in England
Government buildings completed in 1933